KVLL-FM (94.7 FM) is a terrestrial radio station, licensed to Wells, Texas, serving the Lufkin/Nacogdoches area with a Spanish adult hits music format. It is under ownership of Townsquare Media.

KVLL-FM formerly aired an adult contemporary format as "My 94.7". The previous "La Mejor" Regional Mexican format was KVLL-FM's first foray into Spanish language programming.

History
KVLL-FM received its license to cover on November 12, 1993, after Trinity Valley Broadcasting Company received a permit to construct a 50 kilowatt Class C2 FM facility near Rockland, Texas. KVLL-FM was originally licensed to Woodville, the FM sister to the original 1490 KVLL.

Trinity Valley Broadcasting Company sold KVLL & KVLL-FM to Radio Woodville, Inc. on November 20, 1998.

Radio Woodville, Inc. resold KVLL-FM on May 3, 1999 to Yates Broadcasting. This occurred one month after KVLL was sold to Stargazer Broadcasting, Inc. effectively taking Radio Woodville out of the broadcasting industry.

Owned by Steven Yates, KVLL-FM was granted a Minor Modification in June 2002, moving KVLL-FM's transmitter site from Rockland to its current site on U.S. Highway 59, south of Diboll. KVLL-FM received its license to cover, along with changing to the new and current Wells Community of License, on July 2, 2003.

Yates Broadcasting sold KVLL-FM to Gap Broadcasting Lufkin License, LLC. on December 13, 2007. Townsquare Media is the current owner of "My 94.7" KVLL-FM, after acquiring the former GAP cluster.

On February 10, 2020, KVLL-FM changed its format from adult contemporary to Regional Mexican, branded as "La Mejor 94.7".

On July 18, 2022, KVLL-FM changed its format from Regional Mexican to Spanish adult hits, branded as "Juan 94.7".

References

External links
Juan 94.7 official website

VLL-FM
Radio stations established in 1989
Townsquare Media radio stations
VLL-FM
Adult hits radio stations in the United States